West High School is a public high school in Torrance, California, United States. The mascot is the Warrior.

History
West High was established in 1962. It serves the area bounded by 190th Street, Hawthorne Boulevard, Sepulveda Boulevard and the Redondo Beach border. The school colors are brown and gold.

Demographics
The demographic breakdown of the 2,079 students enrolled for the 2015–2016 school year was:
Male - 50.0%
Female - 50.0%
Native American/Alaskan - 0.5%
Asian/Pacific islander - 42.1%
Black - 3.7%
Hispanic - 18.6%
White - 27.0%
Multiracial - 8.0%

Additionally, 22.0% of the students were eligible for free or reduced lunch.

Notable alumni
Jun Ho Bae, missionary
 Sean Berry, professional baseball player
 Emily Day, volleyball player
 Rener Gracie, Brazilian jiu-jitsu practitioner
 Jason Jung, tennis player
 Daryl Sabara, actor
 Steve Sarkisian, football coach
 Bob Staake, New Yorker cover artist and author/illustrator of best selling children's books
 Nick Subis, professional football player
 Paula Weishoff, member of the United States Olympic women's volleyball team in 1984, 1992, and 1996
 TOKiMONSTA, record producer and DJ, Grammy nominated in 2019 for Best Dance / Electronic Album for the album Lune Rouge

References

External links
Official West High School website

High schools in Los Angeles County, California
Education in Torrance, California
Public high schools in California
Buildings and structures in Torrance, California
Educational institutions established in 1962
1962 establishments in California